Zigmars Liepiņš (born 14 October 1952 in Liepāja, Latvian SSR, USSR (now: Latvia) is a Latvian composer, keyboard player and the chairman of the board for the Latvian National Opera. Liepiņš has written songs for choirs, solo artists, orchestras, films, theatres, and operas.

Early life and education 
Zigmars Liepiņš was born in a family of musicians in Liepāja on 14 October 1952. His father Jānis Liepiņš was a violinist and the first person in Liepāja to learn how to play an electric guitar, he also had an important role in the foundation of Liepāja rock. His mother Lidija had a diploma is singing. The first opera Liepiņs saw was Pyotr Tchaikovsky's The Queen of Spades in Liepāja Theatre in early childhood.

In 1971 he graduated from Liepāja Music Secondary School (now Liepāja Music, Art and Design Secondary School) and from Latvian State Conservatoire in 1976 (now – Jāzeps Vītols Latvian Academy of Music).

Career 
At the age of seventeen, he started composing and joined Liepāja band Santa which he left a year later. In 1970 band Santa took part in the festival Liepājas Dzintars where Liepiņš received an award for the best folk song arrangement.

Liepiņš was a keyboard player and songwriter for band Modo (1973 – 1976 and 1977–1982), and also their manager (1978–1982). While in the Soviet Army (1976–1978) Liepiņš was in band Zvaigznīte. Upon returning from the army, Liepiņš re-joined Modo.  In 1982 Modo changed their name to Opus and under Liepiņš' management existed until 1989.

In the 1980s, Liepiņš became popular with numerous hits of the time (Vēl ir laiks, Viss kārtībā, Ceļojums, Dziesma par rozīti, Sentiments). In 1983 Liepiņš wrote the soundtrack for the film Vajadzīga soliste (Soloist Needed) where he also played himself. It was his debut in cinema music.

Other work 
1989–1992 Liepiņš was the director of Showimpex, a concert agency, 1991–1995 – the director of a recording company L&M. 1992–2007 Liepiņš was the president and shareholder of Radio SWH. Since 2013 he has been the chairman of the board for the Latvian National Opera.

Personal life 
Liepiņš has two children with a Latvian singer, producer, film director and entrepreneur Mirdza Zīvere – Zane Kursīte and Jānis Liepiņš. Liepins' son Jānis Liepiņš is a conductor in the Latvian National Opera.

Works

Music for choirs and solo artists 

 2000: song cycle Teika for a mixed choir and soloist
 2001: Tēvzemei un Brīvība for a symphonic orchestra, mixed choir and soloist
 2007: Dziedot dzimu, dziedot augu

Film scores 

 1984: Vajadzīga soliste
 1987: Sēd uz sliekšņa pasaciņa
 1988: Skaitāmpanti
 1990: Ness un Nesija

Music for theatre 

 1976: Spartaks (Latvian National Theatre)
 1977: Emīls un Berlīnes zēni (Latvian National Theatre)
 1979: Iedomu spoguļi (Latvian National Opera)
 1979: Žanna D’Arka
 1981: Iela  (Latvian National Theatre)
 1985: Punktiņa un Antons (Liepāja Theatre)
 1985: Atvadu izrāde (Valmiera Theatre)
 1986: Ķiršu dārzs (Valmiera Theatre)
 1987: Mirabo (Latvian National Theatre)
 1987: Momo
 1992: Suns  (Latvian National Theatre)
 1993: Jēzus  (Latvian National Theatre)
 1995: Svešinieki šeit  (Latvian National Theatre)
 1996: Trešais vārds  (Latvian National Theatre)
 1996: Trīs musketieri  (Latvian National Theatre)
 1996: Trīs draugi
 1998: Solis laika
 2007: musical drama Adata (Latvian National Theatre)

Opera 

 1988: rock opera Lāčplēsis
 1997: opera Parīzes Dievmātes katedrāle  (Latvian National Opera)
 2000: opera No Rozes un asinīm  (Latvian National Opera)

Other 

 1975: Instrumental cycle Diennakts
 1985: Instrumental music Pulss 2
 1994: Vakara mūzika
 1996: Music for the firework display in Ventspils
 2008: Kapteiņa stāsti
 2012: Concerto for a violin and orchestra
 2014: Transcendental Oratorio

Awards and nominations 
In 1997 Liepiņš received the Latvian Music Award for the opera Parīzes Dievmātes katedrāle (Notre-Dame de Paris).

In 2002 Liepiņš was awarded the Order of the Three Stars (Triju Zvaigžņu ordenis).

References

External links

1952 births
Living people
Latvian composers
Musicians from Liepāja